Ivanildo is a given name. People named Ivanildo include:

 Ivanildo Cassamá (born 1986), Guinea-Bissauan footballer
 Ivanildo Fernandes (born 1996), Portuguese footballer
 Ivanildo Misidjan (born 1993), Surinamese footballer
 Ivanildo Rodrigues (born 1988), Brazilian-born Qatari footballer
 Ivanildo Rozenblad (1996–2021), Surinamese footballer
 Marcio Ivanildo da Silva (born 1981), Brazilian footballer

Masculine given names